Don Wayne Reno (born February 8, 1963 in Roanoke, Virginia) is a bluegrass musician and banjo player, and also an ordained minister. He is a son of famed bluegrass musician Don Reno.  Reno was for several years a mainstay of Hayseed Dixie with his brother Dale Reno as the mandolinist. He currently works with his brother and Mitch Harrell in the band Reno and Harrell.

External links
Don Wayne Reno discusses his father.

1963 births
Living people
American bluegrass musicians
American banjoists
Musicians from Virginia
People from Roanoke, Virginia